Rodney John Francis Henderson (born 1938) is an Australian botanist, specialising in taxonomy who worked for more than 48 years for the Queensland Public Service, 41 of those years at the Queensland Herbarium until he retired in 2002. The families he studied included the Solanaceae, Liliaceae, Euphorbiaceae and Rubiaceae. There are about 3,500 labelled specimens in Australian herbaria collected by Henderson, sometimes with other botanists. He was often sought after as an expert in the application of the International Code of Botanical Nomenclature because of his knowledge of the code and of botanical Latin and Greek.

Henderson was actively involved with the Australian Systematic Botany Society from its formation in 1973 and was its second vice-president. He was appointed Australian Botanical Liaison Officer to Kew Gardens for the 1978–79 term. His core activities at the Queensland Herbarium were the maintenance of the plant catalogues, the Queensland Plant Census and editing the journal Austrobaileya.

He is the author of books and papers, especially of plants in the genus Dianella and the species Hibbertia hendersonii, Acacia hendersonii and Corymbia hendersonii have been named in his honour.

References

External links

1938 births
Living people
Place of birth missing (living people)
Australian Botanical Liaison Officers